Niantic may refer to:

 Niantic people, tribe of American Indians
 Niantic, Inc., mobile app developer known for the mobile games Ingress and Pokémon Go

Ships 
Niantic (whaling vessel), relic of San Francisco Gold Rush
USS Niantic Victory, Victory ship later renamed USNS Watertown (T-AGM-6)
USS Niantic (CVE-46), US aircraft carrier later renamed HMS Ranee (D03)

Places  
 Niantic, Connecticut
 Niantic River
 Niantic, Illinois